Carlos Alfonso Castro Borja (born August 1, 1967) is a retired Salvadoran football player.

His position was defender.

Club career
In 1985, he became part of Destroyer in the B League and in 1986 made his Premier League debut with ADET and then transferred to C.D. Chalatenango to play alongside figures like Mauricio Cienfuegos, Carlos "Carlanga" Rivera and Edgar "Kiko" Henriquez. Then he campaigned with C.D. Atlético Marte where he gained prominence and was named to the national squad. He was also named Most Valuable Player in the first division for Atlético Marte in 1990.

Played also in C.D. FAS, Zacapa of Guatemala, C.D. Luis Ángel Firpo, C.D. Águila and played in  Austria with Grazer AK in the Second Bundesliga and finally with San Salvador F.C.

International career
Also in 1985 he formed part of a selection of youth who participated in a tournament in Trinidad and Tobago and then at the Central American Games held in Guatemala.

Castro Borja was a symbol within the national team in the years of 1992 to 1997. He is still remembered as one of the most passionate players who defended his national colors. He had great physical stamina, his sweeper skills were to be admired and also caused problems for rival strikers. He participated in the 1990, 1994, 1998 and 2002 World Cup qualification campaign. He scored the winner against Mexico in the 1994 World Cup qualifiers, which was the first time El Salvador had defeated Mexico in several years.

International goals

Retirement
After finishing his football career with San Salvador FC, he traveled to Las Vegas, Nevada, where he currently resides with his family and is responsible for the school of soccer run by Cruz Azul.

Titles

References

External links

https://web.archive.org/web/20071011011239/http://www.wilmellaw.com/DisplayPage.php?PageID=6025&PID=15

1967 births
Living people
Sportspeople from San Salvador
Association football central defenders
Salvadoran footballers
El Salvador international footballers
1996 CONCACAF Gold Cup players
1998 CONCACAF Gold Cup players
C.D. Chalatenango footballers
C.D. Atlético Marte footballers
Grazer AK players
C.D. FAS footballers
C.D. Luis Ángel Firpo footballers
San Salvador F.C. footballers
Salvadoran expatriate footballers
Expatriate footballers in Austria
Expatriate footballers in Guatemala
Salvadoran expatriate sportspeople in Austria
Salvadoran expatriate sportspeople in Guatemala